Assersif (Arabic: أسرسيف) is a town in the region of Souss-Massa-Drâa in southern Morocco, some 18 km (11.1 mi) south-west of Agadir, the region's capital and largest city.

References 

Populated places in Souss-Massa